The Commonwealth Air Training Plan Museum is an aviation museum located at Brandon Municipal Airport, Brandon, Manitoba.  It is dedicated to the memory of the airmen from the British Commonwealth Air Training Plan, who trained at World War II air stations across Canada.  The museum is in stage 1 of redevelopment, which will see it restored to include the main hangar, medical building, chapel, H-hut aircrew barracks, motor pool building, canteen and interpretive center.

The museum contains several World War II aircraft, displays of navigation, pilot, bombardier, ground crew and transport equipment, various artifacts and a gift shop. The Commonwealth Air Training Plan Museum is on the Canadian Register of Historic Places.

Collection

Airplanes

Vehicles

Gallery

Affiliations
The Museum is affiliated with: CMA, CHIN, and Virtual Museum of Canada.

See also 
 Organization of Military Museums of Canada
 Military history of Canada
 History of the Royal Canadian Air Force

References

External links

 Official Museum Website
 History of the Canadian Forces Museums 1919-2004

Aviation history of Canada
Buildings and structures in Brandon, Manitoba
Aerospace museums in Manitoba
Military and war museums in Canada
Museums with year of establishment missing
World War II museums in Canada
National Historic Sites in Manitoba